Newhall is a civil parish in Cheshire East, England.  It contains 14 buildings that are recorded in the National Heritage List for England as designated listed buildings, all of which are at Grade II.  This grade is the lowest of the three gradings given to listed buildings and is applied to "buildings of national importance and special interest".  The parish contains the village of Aston, but is otherwise almost completely rural, and its listed buildings reflect this, including farmhouses and other houses.  The Shropshire Union Canal runs through the parish, and there are two listed buildings associated with this, a bridge and a milepost.  Also listed are a boundary stone, a telephone kiosk, and a lychgate.

See also

Listed buildings in Wrenbury cum Frith
Listed buildings in Sound
Listed buildings in Hankelow
Listed buildings in Audlem
Listed buildings in Dodcott cum Wilkesley

References
Citations

Sources

 

Listed buildings in the Borough of Cheshire East
Lists of listed buildings in Cheshire